Holló is a Hungarian language surname from the Hungarian word for raven. Notable people with the name include:
 Balázs Holló (1999), Hungarian swimmer
 Mátyás Holló (1977), Hungarian cross-country skier
 Miklós Holló (1943), Hungarian cross-country skier

References 

Hungarian-language surnames
Surnames from nicknames